Precursor B-cell lymphoblastic leukemia is a form of lymphoid leukemia in which too many B-cell lymphoblasts (immature white blood cells) are found in the blood and bone marrow. It is the most common type of acute lymphoblastic leukemia (ALL). It is sometimes additionally classified as a lymphoma, as designated leukemia/lymphoma.

Subtypes
It consists of the following subtypes:

 t(9;22)-BCR/ ABL
 t(v;11q23)-MLL rearrangement
 t(1;19)-E2A/PBX1
 t(12;21)-ETV/ CBFα
 t(17;19)-E2A-HLF

Molecular Mechanisms
One interesting model of precursor B ALL shows aberrant function of a single gene, namely Pax5, as capable to change phenotype of B cells toward precursor cells.

Diagnosis
t(12;21)-ETV/ CBFα has a better prognosis as compared to other subtypes.

Treatment

References

External links 

 Precursor B-lymphoblastic leukemia entry in the public domain NCI Dictionary of Cancer Terms

Acute lymphocytic leukemia